James G. Richards (born November 7, 1969) is a former American football offensive guard in the National Football League for the Dallas Cowboys, Los Angeles Rams and Phoenix Cardinals. He also was a member of the Las Vegas Posse in the Canadian Football League. He was selected by the Dallas Cowboys in the third round (64th overall) of the 1991 NFL Draft. He played college football at the University of California, Berkeley.

Early years
Richards attended Antelope Valley High School, where he was an All-state offensive tackle as a senior. In 1987, he accepted a football scholarship from Cal State Northridge, where he played as an offensive tackle. In 1988, he transferred to Antelope Valley College.

As a junior in 1989, he transferred to the University of California. He was named the starter at left guard, protecting quarterback Toy Taylor, who set a Cal record for total offense and passed for the second most yards in a single-season in school history.

As a senior in 1990, he started all 12 games at left guard and was also the long snapper for punts in the first four contests. He contributed to Russell White and Anthony Wallace becoming the first pair of running backs in school history to gain 1,000 rushing yards in the same year. They also became the fourth and fifth players in Cal history to rush for 1,000 yards in a single-season. Richards only missed 10 offensive snaps in his last two seasons.

Professional career

Dallas Cowboys
Richards was selected by the Dallas Cowboys in the third round (64th overall) of the 1991 NFL Draft. He struggled with his blocking during training camp and was waived on August 26. In September, he was signed to the practice squad, until being released on October 9.

Los Angeles Rams
On October 16, 1991, he was signed to the Los Angeles Rams practice squad. He was released on November 6.

Phoenix Cardinals
On February 4, 1992, he signed as a free agent with the Phoenix Cardinals. He was released on September 1. On November 2, he was signed to the practice squad. He was waived on November 10.

Dallas Cowboys
On April 13, 1993, he signed with the Dallas Cowboys. He was released before the season started.

Las Vegas Posse
In July 1994, Richards was signed by the expansion team Las Vegas Posse of the Canadian Football League. He was injured and appeared in only 3 games. He played as an offensive tackle, before the team folded at the end of the season.

References

External links
Pro Football Archives profile
Just Sports profile

Living people
1969 births
People from Lancaster, California
Players of American football from California
Sportspeople from Los Angeles County, California
American football offensive linemen
Canadian football offensive linemen
American players of Canadian football
Cal State Northridge Matadors football players
Antelope Valley College alumni
California Golden Bears football players
Las Vegas Posse players
Antelope Valley High School alumni